Martin van Leeuwen (born 1981-11-21 in Leiden, Netherlands) is a retired Dutch football (soccer) defender. He made his debut in Dutch professional football on 2002-08-30 for Sparta Rotterdam in a competition match against FC Volendam (2-3).

References
Van Leeuwen on Ronald Zwiers
VI Profile

Living people
1981 births
Dutch footballers
Association football defenders
Sparta Rotterdam players
Eerste Divisie players
Footballers from Leiden